The 35th TVyNovelas Awards is an academy of special awards to the best of soap operas and TV shows. The awards ceremony took place on March 26, 2017. The ceremony was televised in Mexico by Las Estrellas and in the United States by Univision. 

Maite Perroni and Cristián de la Fuente hosted the show for the first time. La Candidata won 8 awards, the most for the evening including Best Telenovela of the Year. Other winners Vino el amor won 4 awards, Tres veces Ana won 3 awards, El hotel de los secretos and Sueño de amor won 2 awards each and Las amazonas won one award.

Summary of awards and nominations

Winners and nominees

Novelas

Others

Univision Awards 
The following awards were presented on the Univision broadcast that aired on April 16, 2017

Special recognitions 
 Por siempre Joan Sebastian - Carla Estrada
 ¡Despierta América! - 20 Year Anniversary

Performers

References 

TVyNovelas Awards
TVyNovelas Awards ceremonies
TVyNovelas Awards
TVyNovelas Awards
Premios TVyNovelas